Orin C. Smith (June 26, 1942 – March 1, 2018) was an American businessman who served as president and chief executive officer (CEO) of Starbucks Corporation from 2000 to 2005. He joined Starbucks as vice president and chief financial officer in 1990, becoming president and chief operating officer in 1994, and a director of Starbucks in 1996. He was preceded by Howard Shultz and succeeded by Jim Donald who was himself succeeded by Shultz.

Biography
Prior to joining Starbucks, Smith spent much of his career in management consulting with Deloitte & Touche. Later he became the Chief Budget Officer for two Governors: Dixy Lee Ray and Booth Gardner, followed by service as CFO of two international transportation companies.

With Smith onboard first as CFO then COO and finally CEO, Starbucks expanded to more than 10,000 locations worldwide and more than $5 billion in sales. Smith led Starbucks to link coffee production to the protection of rain forests.
Smith retired from Starbucks in 2005 and later became a director of Nike, Inc. and The Walt Disney Company. He was elected independent lead director of The Walt Disney Company on March 13, 2012. He served as chair of the Starbucks Foundation, vice chair of the University of Washington Board of Regents and member of the Conservation International board of directors. 

Smith graduated from the University of Washington in 1965 and the Harvard Business School in 1967. Smith was the recipient of many honors and awards, including the highest honor given to graduates of the Harvard Business School and one of Business Week's best managers in 2004.

Personal life
Smith was a resident of Jackson, Wyoming. He was born in Ryderwood, Washington, a logging camp. Soon after he was born, the family moved to Chehalis, Washington. He graduated from W. F. West High School in Chehalis where he grew up. He was a member of the 1960 high school basketball team, the Bearcats, which won the state Class A basketball championship. The local Vernetta Smith branch library in Chehalis, part of the Timberland Regional Library system, bears his mother's name.

Smith died of pancreatic cancer at his home in Palm Desert, California, at the age of 75.

References

External links
Orin C. Smith corporate biography

1942 births
2018 deaths
American chief executives of food industry companies
American chief financial officers
American chief operating officers
Businesspeople in coffee
Directors of The Walt Disney Company
Directors of Starbucks
Harvard Business School alumni
Nike, Inc. people
People from Chehalis, Washington
University of Washington alumni
Deaths from pancreatic cancer
Deaths from cancer in California